Oranjestad (literally "Orange City") is the capital and largest city of Aruba, a constituent country of the Kingdom of the Netherlands. It is located on the southern coast near the western end of the island country. In the local language, Papiamento, Oranjestad is often referred to as "Playa". In 2010, the population of the capital was 28,294.

History
The town was built around Fort Zoutman shortly after it was built in 1796. Initially, the town had no official name, being known only as the town on the Bay of Horses (Paardenbaai in Dutch), a place from which horses were raised and exported to neighbouring Curaçao and Jamaica. In the early 19th century, Oranjestad was like a village, because Aruba had no large plantations or international traders. The total population of the island in 1816 was estimated at 1,732 most of whom were farmers. Fort Zoutman was the main building around which 200 small houses had been erected. The town had two churches: one Catholic and one Protestant. Nearby was the fishing village of Rancho.

Oranjestad became the capital city of the island in 1824. It was named after the first King William I of the Netherlands. During that period interest in Aruba increased due to the discovery of alluvial gold deposits. The oil industry discovered Aruba in 1924. The establishment of an oil refinery by Lago Oil and Transport Company not only resulted in a population increase, but a significant increase in the prosperity of the island. From the 1960s onwards, tourism became more important and has resulted in the creation of a large hotel zone. Administratively, the city has been split in two districts: East and West. Oranjestad, Noord and Santa Cruz have merged into one near continuous urban area covering the north of the island.

Culture

There is some Dutch Colonial architecture. Due to increased government interest in maintaining the island's cultural heritage, a number of old buildings and houses in the center of town have been transformed into colorfully restored landmarks, such as the lime-colored City Hall on Wilhelminastraat.

Sports
Oranjestad is home to the football teams SV Dakota, SV Racing Club Aruba, and SV River Plate Aruba, all of which play in the top Aruban Division di Honor.

Economy
Air Aruba once had its headquarters in Oranjestad. Air Aruba suspended its operations on 23 October 2000.

Tiara Air has had its head office in Oranjestad since 2006, except between 2014 and 2016 when the company suspended services due to the Venezuelan Airline Crisis.

Tourism
Several modern recreations have emerged, including the outdoor shopping mall at Royal Plaza, and a few scattered buildings along Main Street and on the Main Square.

Fort Zoutman is one of the town's attractions, others being the tax-free harbour and the Willem III Tower, located near the fort.

There are about eight museums on the island.

Renaissance Island
The touristically named Renaissance Island (formerly Sonesta Island) is a  cay (or barrier reef) island, officially known as the Bucuti Rif and it is off the coast near Oranjestad. It is privately owned and has the only private beaches on Aruba. There are two beaches: Iguana Beach and Flamingo Beach. Flamingoes can be seen on the island. However, they are not native to Aruba.

Geography 
Small portions of the city are formed from a series of man-made expansions of land into the sea. Present-day Renaissance Marketplace (formerly Seaport Marketplace), as well as the adjacent Queen Wilhelmina Park, lies within this land reclamation. The Oranjestad Reef Islands Important Bird Area lies adjacent to the main harbour.

Climate 
Oranjestad has a hot semi-arid climate (Köppen BSh). Temperatures are high year-round, the air is humid with low diurnal temperature variation also year-round, whilst rainfall is very low due to the region lying in a zone of divergence between the southeast trade winds to the south and the North American Monsoon further north. The exception to this aridity occurs during the short rainy season from September to January when the southward retreat of the Intertropical Convergence Zone generates more frequent moist northeasterly winds.

Transport

Oranjestad is served by the Queen Beatrix International Airport,  from the city center. Its downtown is served by a tramway line inaugurated in December 2012.

Caya G. F. Betico Croes, also called Main Street, is Aruba's main shopping street in Oranjestad, however in the past few years shoppers have increasingly turned to Lloyd G. Smith Boulevard, the main thoroughfare in the city. This is in part because the boulevard is closer to the cruise ship terminal and harbour area.

Oranjestad is home to Paardenbaai, the largest port on the island for passengers. Paardenbaai is capable of docking up to five large vessels. A port for cargo vessels is at Barcadera  to the east. In 2016, Barcadera became the main cargo port. Plans have been proposed to increase loading capacity at Oranjestad, and for the construction of a marina to make up for inadequate docking space available for yachts and fishing boats.

Traffic in the center of town is a growing issue for island commuters. The government is under pressure to make improvements to the periphery, which runs around the city. In late 2006 planning began for the installment of a roundabout, along the main boulevard and next to the Free Zone, at one of the island's most troublesome intersections. The plans were completed in 2008. In the meantime, several businesses and government departments have relocated their offices outside of the city centre, spurring a boom in construction and modernisation.

Education
Oranjestad is home to the University of Aruba, which offers programs in law and economics, and to the island's largest secondary school (Colegio Arubano), both modeled on the Dutch system. Many students enroll in universities in the Netherlands for graduate and postgraduate degrees.

Notable people
Dave Benton, winner of the Eurovision Song Contest 2001 for Estonia
Xander Bogaerts, baseball player, two-time World Series champion
Bobby Farrell, singer, Boney M
Vince Irie, singer-songwriter
Chadwick Tromp, baseball player, Atlanta Braves

See also
Elias Mansur Stadion

References

Bibliography

External links

 
Capitals in the Caribbean
Populated places established in the 1790s
Populated places in Aruba
1798 establishments in Aruba